Joseph Raoul Cédras (born July 9, 1949) is a Haitian former military officer who was the de facto ruler of Haiti from 1991 to 1994.

Background
A mulatto, Cédras was educated in the United States and was a member of the U.S.-trained Leopard Corps. He also trained with the Spanish military. Cédras was chosen by the US and France to be in charge of security for the 1990–91 Haitian general election, and subsequently named Commander-in-Chief of the Armed Forces by Jean-Bertrand Aristide in early 1991. Under Aristide, Cédras "was one important source for the CIA, providing reports critical of President Aristide."

De facto leader of Haiti (1991–1994)
Cédras, Lieutenant General in the Forces Armées d'Haïti (FAdH; the Armed Forces of Haiti) at the time, was responsible for the 1991 Haitian coup d'état which ousted President Aristide on 29 September 1991. 

Some human rights groups criticized Cédras's rule, alleging that innocent people were killed by the FAdH military and FRAPH paramilitary units. The US State Department said in 1995 that in the three years following the coup "international observers estimated that more than 3,000 men, women and children were murdered by or with the complicity of Haiti's then-coup regime." 

While remaining the de facto leader of Haiti as commander of the country's armed forces, Cédras did not retain his position as head of state, preferring to have other politicians as official presidents. As required by Article 149, of the 1987 Haitian Constitution, Haiti's Parliament appointed Supreme Court Justice Joseph Nérette as provisional President, to fill in until elections could be held. The elections were planned for December 1991,  but Nérette resigned and was replaced undemocratically by Supreme Court Justice Émile Jonassaint.

Under the delegation of U.S. president Bill Clinton, the former President Jimmy Carter, accompanied by Senator Sam Nunn and General Colin Powell, urged Provisional  President Émile Jonassaint to relinquish his control in 1994, in order to avoid a potential invasion. Jonassaint resigned. General Cédras had indicated his desire to remain in Haiti. However, the Americans did not think this was the best solution and convinced the General that in the national interest, he should consider departing for Panama. The United States reportedly gave Cédras $1 million and rented three properties as incentive to leave power.

Later life
After leaving Haiti, Cédras went to Panama where he remains. Aristide then returned to power in Haiti and was forced into resigning again in 2004.

Documentary 
Uden titel (1996)

See also
Operation Uphold Democracy

References

External links 
 https://web.archive.org/web/20070319215347/http://encarta.msn.com/encyclopedia_761576153_8/Haiti.html#p116
 https://web.archive.org/web/20081013085342/http://findarticles.com/p/articles/mi_m1282/is_n23_v45/ai_14753246
 http://news.bbc.co.uk/1/hi/world/americas/942489.stm

Presidents of Haiti
Leaders of Haitian junta
Living people
1949 births
Haitian exiles
Haitian people of French descent
Haitian people convicted of crimes against humanity
Leaders who took power by coup
Haitian generals
Haitian anti-communists
Haitian politicians convicted of crimes
1990s in Haiti
20th-century Haitian politicians
Haitian expatriates in Panama